Phillip Jay Slosburg (October 30, 1926 – August 31, 2018) was an American football defensive back who played for the Boston Yanks/New York Bulldogs. He played college football at Temple University, having previously attended Central High School in Philadelphia. He was inducted into the Temple Athletics Hall of Fame in 1979.

References

1926 births
2018 deaths
American football defensive backs
Boston Yanks players
New York Bulldogs players
Temple Owls football players
Players of American football from Philadelphia